Torben Blech (born 12 February 1995) is a German pole vaulter and former decathlete. He won a silver medal at the 2019 Summer Universiade.

His personal bests in the pole vault are 5.80 metres outdoors (Leverkusen 2019) and 5.86 metres indoors (Düsseldorf 2021).

International competitions

References

1995 births
Living people
German male pole vaulters
German decathletes
Universiade silver medalists for Germany
Universiade medalists in athletics (track and field)
Medalists at the 2019 Summer Universiade
Athletes (track and field) at the 2020 Summer Olympics
Olympic athletes of Germany